Wagi, also known as Kamba or Foran, is a Papuan language of Papua New Guinea.

Phonology

References

Hanseman languages
Languages of Madang Province